Spay may refer to:

 Spaying, the neutering of a female animal
 Spay, Germany, a municipality in Rhineland-Palatinate, Germany
 Spay, Sarthe, a commune in the Sarthe departement, France
 SPAY, the ICAO airport code for Tnte. Gral. Gerardo Pérez Pinedo Airport in Atalaya, Peru

See also
Spey (disambiguation)